Cedar Creek is a small village located in the Tweed Shire in the Northern Rivers region of New South Wales, Australia.

References 

Suburbs of Tweed Heads, New South Wales